Peter Axel William Locke King, 5th Earl of Lovelace (26 November 1951 – 31 January 2018), styled Viscount Ockham before 1964, was a British peer.

Lovelace succeeded his father, Peter King, 4th Earl of Lovelace, in 1964.

He lived in the Highlands of Scotland, for many years in the family home Torridon House and later in Inverness. He was married twice: first, to Kirsteen Oihrig Kennedy in 1980; they were divorced in 1989.  He married Kathleen Anne Rose Smolders in 1994. He sold house items for £800,000 as well as the Torridon house in 2015.

Upon his death without issue in 2018, his titles became extinct.

Arms

References

External links

1951 births
2018 deaths
Peter

Lovelace